Luis Alvarado y González (c. 1846 – c. 1916) was Mayor of Ponce, Puerto Rico, from 11 May 1896 to 28 March 1897. He was the commanding officer in town installed by the military government in Puerto Rico at the time (1896).

Mayoral term
Alvarado González was an prominent artillery commander in Ponce with great speaking skills, but had no knowledge of public administration at the time of his appointment as mayor in May 1896.  His administrative and municipal council meetings always finished within the hour because, in advance of his meetings, he had already gained whatever support was need to approve of reject proposals. As such he managed to run council meetings were peace and harmony reigned.

He had the municipal government prepare for and carry out a celebration for the Las Mañanitas festivities on 12 December 1896 which was well received by the townspeople. He will also be remembered for his unwavering support for the founding of the Casino de Ponce.

Resignation
He resigned less than a year as mayor to return to his work in the military in San Juan. He later returned to Ponce in his role as Delegado del Gobernador Civil (Representative of the Civil Governor).

See also

 List of Puerto Ricans
 List of mayors of Ponce, Puerto Rico

References

Further reading
 Ramon Marin. Las Fiestas Populares de Ponce. Editorial Universidad de Puerto Rico. 1994. 
 Fay Fowlie de Flores. Ponce, Perla del Sur: Una Bibliografía Anotada. Second Edition. 1997. Ponce, Puerto Rico: Universidad de Puerto Rico en Ponce. p. 116. Item 589. 
 Felix Bernier Matos. Cromos ponceños. (por Fray Justo) Ponce, Puerto Rico: Imprenta "La Libertad." 1896. (Colegio Universitario Tecnológico de Ponce, CUTPO)
 Fay Fowlie de Flores. Ponce, Perla del Sur: Una Bibliografía Anotada. Second Edition. 1997. Ponce, Puerto Rico: Universidad de Puerto Rico en Ponce. p. 328. Item 1640. 
 Luis Muñoz Rivera. "Después del banquete." Obras completas: prosa, enero-diciembre, 1896. pp. 222–223. San Juan: Instituto de Cultura Puertorriqueña. 1963. (CUTPO)
 Fay Fowlie de Flores. Ponce, Perla del Sur: Una Bibliografía Anotada. Second Edition. 1997. Ponce, Puerto Rico: Universidad de Puerto Rico en Ponce. p. 336. Item 1672. 
 Ponce. Presupuesto ordinario de gastos e ingresos para el año económico de 1896 a 97. Ponce, Puerto Rico: Tip. El Vapor, s.f. (Universidad de Puerto Rico)

External links
 Guardia Civil española (c. 1898) (Includes military ranks in 1880s Spanish Empire.)

Mayors of Ponce, Puerto Rico
1840s births
1910s deaths
Year of birth uncertain
Year of death uncertain